The 7th constituency of the Rhône (French: Septième circonscription du Rhône) is a French legislative constituency in the Rhône département. Like the other 576 French constituencies, it elects one MP using a two round electoral system.

Description

The 7th constituency of the Rhône lies to the east of Lyon. It is a densely packed constituency predominantly made up of suburbs of the city divided from each other by the Rhône. One of these suburbs Vaulx-en-Velin lies between two branches of the river, surrounded on three sides by it and on the other by the Grand parc de Miribel-Jonage.

This constituency was one of the more left leaning in the department, until 2017 with the exception of 1993 it had always returned a PS deputy. At the 2017 elections the PS incumbent came 5th leaving En Marche! and The Republicans to fight the second round.

Assembly members

Election results

2022

 
 
 
 
|-
| colspan="8" bgcolor="#E9E9E9"|
|-
 
 

 
 
 
 
 * Gomez stood as a PS dissident, without the support of the party or the NUPES alliance.

2017

 
 
 
 
 
 
 
|-
| colspan="8" bgcolor="#E9E9E9"|
|-

2012

 
 
 
 
 
 
 
|-
| colspan="8" bgcolor="#E9E9E9"|
|-

2007

 
 
 
 
 
|-
| colspan="8" bgcolor="#E9E9E9"|
|-

2002

 
 
 
 
 
 
|-
| colspan="8" bgcolor="#E9E9E9"|
|-

1997

 
 
 
 
 
 
|-
| colspan="8" bgcolor="#E9E9E9"|
|-

References

7